Matarr Jarju (born 1957) is a Gambian wrestler. He competed in the men's freestyle 82 kg at the 1988 Summer Olympics.

References

External links
 

1957 births
Living people
Gambian male sport wrestlers
Olympic wrestlers of the Gambia
Wrestlers at the 1988 Summer Olympics
Place of birth missing (living people)
Gambian sports executives and administrators